William Henry Gummer (7 December 1884 – 13 December 1966) was a New Zealand architect.

Gummer was born in Auckland, New Zealand, in 1884. He studied architecture at the Royal Academy of Arts from 1909 to 1912 and during that time worked with Edwin Lutyens in London After returning to New Zealand he entered a partnership with Wellington-based firm Hoggard and Prouse, creating the firm Hoggard, Prouse and Gummer. He worked in the firm's Auckland office on High Street. Hoggard left the partnership in 1921, leaving Prouse and Gummer in partnership until its dissolution 1923. In 1924 he started the firm Gummer and Ford with Charles Reginald Ford. This new partnership won many architectural competitions around New Zealand.

Many of Gummer's buildings are listed with Heritage New Zealand; often they are classed as Category 1. His own house, Stoneways in Epsom, is also listed as Category 1.

References

1884 births
1966 deaths
People from Auckland
20th-century New Zealand architects
Place of death missing